Catherine Woolley may refer to:

 Catherine S. Woolley (born 1965) American neuroendocrinologist
 Jane Thayer (1904–2005), the pen name of American children's writer Catherine Woolley

See also
Katharine Woolley (1888–1945), British archaeologist